Elachista exactella is a moth of the family Elachistidae. It is found from the Iberian Peninsula, east to Romania, north through France and the Benelux to Fennoscandia, east through central Europe to the Baltic region and northern Russia.

The larvae feed on Deschampsia flexuosa.

References

External links
Lepidoptera of Sweden
bladmineerders.nl

exactella
Moths described in 1855
Moths of Japan
Moths of Europe